Galleri Sudurgata 7 was a conceptual and experimental art gallery active in Reykjavík, Iceland in the 1970s and 1980s.

The gallery closely collaborated with Fluxus artists including Eric Andersen,  Robert Filliou, Mail artists like Robin Crozier and Endre TÓT and other Conceptual artists such as Dick Higgins, Maurizio Nannucci, Hreinn Fridfinnsson, Dieter Roth, Ruri, Peter Schmidt and Jacek Tylicki.

Bibliography 
 La Biennale di Venezia By Harald Szeemann, Cecilia Liveriero Lavelli, Lara Facco, Arsenale di Venezia, Chiara Barbieri, 2001
 Vanishing presence By Eugenia Parry, Eugenia Parry Janis, Max Kozloff, Adam D. Weinberg, Walker Art Center, 1989
 Sacred spaces By Dominique Nahas, David L. Miller, Everson Museum of Art, 1987
 Landscapes from a high latitude By Julian Freeman, Brighton Polytechnic. Gallery, Listasafn Íslands, 1990
 Sleeping beauty—art now By Solomon R. Guggenheim Museum, 1982
 Island / Iceland, Zona no profit art space, Florence 1979

Art museums and galleries in Iceland
Museums in Reykjavík